James Owen Boylan (born March 19, 1939) is a former American football wide receiver who played in the National Football League for the Minnesota Vikings. Born in Washington, D.C., he attended Birmingham High School in Lake Balboa, Los Angeles, California, followed by Washington State University. He joined the Vikings during the 1963 season and played three games, during which he recorded a total of six receptions for 78 yards. His only touchdown came in a 41–10 loss to the Baltimore Colts in Week 13.

References

1939 births
Living people
Players of American football from Washington, D.C.
American football wide receivers
Minnesota Vikings players
Washington State Cougars football players